Beno Airport  is an airport serving Beno, Democratic Republic of the Congo.

References

Airports in Mai-Ndombe Province